Evergestis rimosalis, commonly known as the cross-striped cabbageworm, is a species of moth in the family Crambidae. It is found in most of the eastern United States.

The wingspan is about 25 mm. The forewings are light brownish-grey with dark grey patches. The hindwings are white with dark grey apical shading and a dark discal spot

The larvae feed on various Brassicaceae species, including cabbage, collard greens and Brussels sprouts.

References

Moths described in 1854
Evergestis
Moths of North America